São Paulo Futebol Clube, commonly known as São Paulo, is a professional women's association football club based in São Paulo, Brazil. Founded in 1997, the team is affiliated with Federação Paulista de Futebol and play their home games at Estádio do Morumbi. The team colors, reflected in their logo and uniform, are white, red and black. They play in the top tier of women's football in Brazil, the Campeonato Brasileiro de Futebol Feminino, and in the Campeonato Paulista de Futebol Feminino, the first division of the traditional in-state competition.

History

First spell
The Brazilian Football Confederation (CBF) successfully encouraged São Paulo and its other leading clubs to form female teams after the national women's team's performance exceeded expectations at the 1996 Olympics. Coach Zé Duarte (who was also the Brazil women's national team coach) immediately assembled a competitive São Paulo team who won state and national titles in their debut 1997 season. The players had been co-opted from the existing successful women's team Saad Esporte Clube.

In 1998 the team only lost two matches but both defeats resulted in elimination from the state and national competitions at the hands of local rivals Portuguesa (who played as Lusa Sant'Anna). São Paulo rebounded to recapture the Paulista title in 1999. Eight of the 20-player Brazil squad at the 1999 FIFA Women's World Cup were contracted to São Paulo FC. In March 2000 the disbandment of the team was announced, as most of the leading Brazilian players signalled their intent to leave for the upcoming American Women's United Soccer Association.

Return

In 2015 São Paulo decided to return to women's football and reached the final of the Paulista, losing to São José. The team was disbanded again immediately afterwards when the parent club failed to attract adequate sponsorship. The team's coach Marcello Frigério said the team had been a partnership between São Paulo FC and the Centro de Apoio Profissionalizante, Educacional e Social (CAPES), which failed when the latter did not pay in line with the agreement. Female football returned to São Paulo in 2017, when an under-17 youth team was launched in partnership with Centro Olímpico. Another adult team was put together in 2019, which included the high-profile signing of Cristiane Rozeira.

Players

Current squad

Former players
For details of current and former players, see :Category:São Paulo FC (women) players.

Notable players

Formiga
Kátia Cilene
Sissi

Honours

Senior team
 Campeonato Brasileiro
 Winners: 1997
 Campeonato Brasileiro Série A2
 Winners: 2020
 Campeonato Paulista
 Winners: 1997, 1999
 Brasil Ladies Cup
 Winners: 2021

Youth team

 Campeonato Brasileiro Sub-18
 Winners: 2021
 Campeonato Brasileiro Sub-16
 Winners: 2019
 Campeonato Paulista Sub-17
 Winners (4): 2017, 2018, 2019, 2021

References

External links
  

women
Association football clubs established in 1997
Women's football clubs in Brazil
1997 establishments in Brazil